Distichochlamys citrea is a species of flowering plant in the ginger family. It was first described by M.F.Newman.

Range
Distichochlamys citrea is native to Vietnam.

References 

Zingiberoideae